Jimalee Chitwood Burton (née Jimalee Chitwood, January 23, 1906  2000), also known as Ho-Chee-Nee, was an American writer, artist, and lecturer who claimed Creek-Cherokee ancestry.

Early life
Jimalee Chitwood was born on January 23, 1906, in El Reno, Oklahoma Territory, the first child of James Alexander Chitwood and Mary Caroline Burger Chitwood. Her father, whom Burton identified as being of Cherokee descent, was as a rider for the Pony Express and had moved from Texas to Oklahoma Territory during the Land Rush of 1889. Burton identified her mother as being of Creek and Cherokee descent.

Career

In 1949, Burton's oil painting Buffalo Dance was showcased at the Philbrook Museum of Art annual Native American painting competition. She became the first woman to exhibit at the event and also received the "Third Purchase Prize for the Woodland Region". How the Boy Medicine Came to the Kiowas, an oil painting on canvas that was completed by Burton in the "mid-20th century", is now housed at the Gilcrease Museum in Tulsa, Oklahoma.

Burton was also a prolific writer. In 1979, Burton's anthology of poems, prose, and traditional stories, titled Indian Heritage, Indian Pride: Stories That Touched My Life, was released by the University of Oklahoma Press. She pledged all of her royalties to the construction of a Cherokee chapel; the Cherokee Heritage Center Memorial Chapel in Park Hill, Oklahoma was erected in 1976. Burton also edited The Native Voice for fifteen years.

Personal life and death
Jimalee Chitwood married radio personality Dan "Smiling Dan" Burton (October 1, 1889  May 10, 1954) in 1933 until his death. The couple did not have any children together, although Dan Burton had a son from a previous marriage.

References

Notes

Citations

Bibliography
 
 
 
 
 
 

1906 births
2000 deaths
People from El Reno, Oklahoma
20th-century American women writers
Artists from Oklahoma
American people of Cherokee descent
American people who self-identify as being of Native American descent